Yuck is an exclamation of disgust.

Yuck may also refer to:

Music

 Yuck (band), a British rock band
 Yuck (album), their 2011 album
 "Yuck" (Joyryde song), 2019
 "Yuck", by 2 Chainz feat. Lil Wayne from Based on a T.R.U. Story (2012)
 "Yuck", by Logic from Bobby Tarantino II (2018)
 "Yuck", by Charli XCX from Crash (2022)

Others
 Yuck factor, the wisdom of repugnance
 Yuck (Yin Yang Yo!), a character in animated television series Yin Yang Yo!
 "Yuck!", 2009 track from Matt Tilley's prank phone call album The Final Call
 Yuck!, 1984 book by James Stevenson
 Yuck! The Nature and Moral Significance of Disgust, 2011 book by Daniel R. Kelly

See also
 Yuk (disambiguation)
 Yak (disambiguation)